"Down by the Station" (also known as "Down at the Station") is a popular song written by Paul Mills and Slim Gaillard and first recorded by The Slim Gaillard Trio in 1947. The song was most famously recorded by Tommy Dorsey in 1948.

Background
The song remains popular today as a children's music standard. The opening lines of the song are: Down by the station, early in the morning, see the little pufferbellies all in a row. It is a simple song about a railroad station master seeing the steam locomotives off to work.  The song itself is much older than 1948; it has been seen in a 1931 Recreation magazine.

Whether deliberately copied or not, the tune is very closely related to the chorus of the French-Canadian folk song "Alouette".  Although the first line is similar to "Alouette", it is more closely related to the tune of "The Itsy-Bitsy Spider," with the first two lines being similar. The third line of "Down By the Station" is higher in pitch than the second, and the fourth line returns to the pitch of the first line (except for a higher pitched or onomatopoetic "Toot! Toot!").

Other versions
The Four Preps recorded a version of "Down By the Station" in 1959, featuring an entirely different set of lyrics by group members Bruce Belland and Glen Larson. It peaked at #13 on the Billboard Hot 100.

Popular culture
Reverend Wilbert Awdry may have been inspired by the words of the song to write his first Railway Series story, Edward's Day Out.

See also

List of train songs

References 

1948 songs
1959 singles
Children's songs
Tommy Dorsey songs
Songs about trains
Songs written by Slim Gaillard